Carenero Island (in Spanish: Isla Carenero) is a long and forested island located just a few hundred meters east of Isla Colón, in the Bocas del Toro Archipelago, Panama. The name of the island comes from the nautical term careening, which means to lean a ship on its side for repairing or scraping its hull. There are no roads on the island.

See also
List of islands of Panama

References

Caribbean islands of Panama